Abakar Sabon (also spelled Saboune or Sabone) was the leader of the Movement of Central African Liberators for Justice rebel group during the Central African Republic Bush War.

Biography 
Born in Boda to a Chadian father and Central African mother, he was the former FACA captain. Sabon worked François Bozizé from 2002-2003 when he wanted to topple Ange-Félix Patassé. He was the main architect behind the rebels taking control of Bangui on 15 March 2003. After Bozize managed to topple Patasse, Sabon was appointed as special representative for the Ministry of Defense in January 2004.

As special representative for the Ministry of Defense, Bozize asked Sabone to go to France to mediate the conflict. As he arrived in France, he discovered that Bozize sent his Presidential Guard to assassinate him. He managed to escape the assassination attempt. Due to this incident, he decided to resist Bozizé by establishing MLCJ.

In 2006, three Bozize's opposition groups formed an armed coalition, UFDR, and Sabon was appointed as the UFDR spokesman. He demanded Muslims to have more power in the government and establish an inclusive government where all factions could join. Sabon also called for a Muslim to be appointed as a Prime Minister.

On 25 November 2006, along with Michel Djotodia, Sabon was arrested in Cotonou. They were released in February 2008. Afterward, Sabon became Bozize's advisor on disarmament,
demobilization, and reintegration (DDR) on 13 January 2011. On May 2011, he resigned as the leader of MLCJ and advisor to Bozize to retire. He appointed MLCJ chief of staff, Abator Tidjani, as the head of MLCJ. However, the appointment of Tidjani was contested by Adoum Rakiss. Due to the MLCJ's internal conflict, Sabon rejoined MLCJ and became the leader of MLCJ on October 2011, replacing Abator Tidjani.

On 3 February 2013, Bozize appointed Sabon as a minister of tourism and craft industry. Three months later, he founded a political party, Parti de nouvelle generation (PNG). On 23 July 2014, he signed a cease-fire agreement on behalf of the MLCJ. However, he refused to accept Bangui Forum's proposals for peace in May 2015. Instead, he waged war against the central government.

References

Living people
Central African Republic Bush War
Central African Republic politicians
Year of birth missing (living people)